The Quine–Putnam indispensability argument, which is also known as the indispensability argument, is an argument in the philosophy of mathematics for the existence of abstract mathematical objects such as numbers and sets, a position known as mathematical platonism. It was named after the philosophers Willard Quine and Hilary Putnam, and is one of the most-important arguments in the philosophy of mathematics. It is widely considered to be one of the best arguments for platonism.
 
Although elements of the indispensability argument may have originated with thinkers such as Gottlob Frege and Kurt Gödel, Quine's development of the argument was unique for introducing to it a number of his philosophical positions such as naturalism, confirmational holism, and the criterion of ontological commitment. Putnam gave Quine's argument its first detailed formulation in his 1971 book Philosophy of Logic. He later came to disagree with various aspects of Quine's thinking, however, and formulated his own indispensability argument based on the no miracles argument in the philosophy of science. A standard form of the argument in contemporary philosophy is credited to Mark Colyvan; whilst being influenced by both Quine and Putnam, it differs in important ways from their formulations. Stanford Encyclopedia of Philosophy presents it as:

 We ought to have ontological commitment to all and only the entities that are indispensable to our best scientific theories.
 Mathematical entities are indispensable to our best scientific theories.
 Therefore, we ought to have ontological commitment to mathematical entities.

Nominalists, philosophers who reject the existence of abstract objects, have argued against both premises of this argument. The most influential argument against the indispensability argument, which was primarily advanced by Hartry Field, denies the indispensability of mathematical entities to science. This argument is supported by attempts to reformulate scientific and mathematical theories to remove all references to mathematical entities. The premise we should believe in all of the entities of science has also been criticised by philosophers, including Penelope Maddy, Mary Leng, Elliott Sober, and Joseph Melia. The arguments of these writers inspired a new explanatory version of the argument, which Alan Baker and Mark Colyvan support, that argues mathematics is indispensable to specific scientific explanations as well as whole theories.

Background 
In his 1973 paper "Mathematical Truth", Paul Benacerraf presented a dilemma for the philosophy of mathematics. According to Benacerraf, mathematical sentences seem to imply the existence of mathematical objects such as numbers but if such objects were to exist, they would be unknowable to us. He supported the claim that mathematical sentences seem to imply the existence of mathematical objects with the idea that mathematics should not have its own special semantics. According to this reasoning, if the sentence "Mars is a planet" implies the existence of the planet Mars, then the sentence "two is a prime number" should similarly imply the existence of the number two. Such mathematical objects, however, would be abstract objects, which do not have causal powers—they cannot cause things to happen—and have no spatio-temporal location. But according to Benacerraf, on the basis of the causal theory of knowledge, we would not be able to know about such objects because they cannot come into causal contact with us.

The philosophy of mathematics is split into two main strands; platonism and nominalism. Platonism argues for the existence of abstract mathematical objects such as numbers and sets whilst nominalism denies their existence. Each of these views can easily overcome one part of Benacerraf's dilemma but has problems overcoming the other. Because nominalism rejects the existence of mathematical objects, it faces no epistemological problem but it does face problems concerning the semantic part of the dilemma. Platonism maintains a continuity between the semantics of ordinary sentences and mathematical sentences by claiming mathematical sentences do refer to abstract mathematical objects but it has difficulty explaining how we can know about such objects.

The indispensability argument aims to overcome the epistemological problem posed against platonism by providing a justification for belief in abstract mathematical objects. It is part of a broad class of indispensability arguments most-commonly applied in the philosophy of mathematics, but which also includes arguments in the philosophy of language and ethics. In the most-general sense, indispensability arguments aim to support their conclusion based on the claim that the truth of the conclusion is indispensable or necessary for a certain purpose. When applied in the field of ontology—the study of what exists—they exemplify a Quinean strategy for establishing the existence of controversial entities that cannot be directly investigated. According to this strategy, the indispensability of these entities for formulating a theory of other less-controversial entities counts as evidence for their existence. In the case of philosophy of mathematics, the indispensability of mathematical entities for formulating scientific theories is taken as evidence for the existence of those mathematical entities.

Overview of the argument 
Mark Colyvan presents the argument in the Stanford Encyclopedia of Philosophy in the following form:

 We ought to have ontological commitment to all and only the entities that are indispensable to our best scientific theories.
 Mathematical entities are indispensable to our best scientific theories.
 Therefore, we ought to have ontological commitment to mathematical entities.

The first premise is based on two fundamental assumptions; naturalism and confirmational holism. Naturalism rejects the notion philosophy can provide a foundational justification for science because it views the methods of science as the most-persuasive methods of justification. Instead, naturalism views philosophy as continuous with science rather than as preceding science, and views science as providing a full characterization of the world. Quine summarized naturalism as "the recognition that it is within science itself, and not in some prior philosophy, that reality is to be identified and described".

Confirmational holism is the view scientific theories cannot be confirmed in isolation and must be confirmed as wholes. According to Michael Resnik, one example of this is the hypothesis an observer will see oil and water separate out if they are added together because they do not mix. Confirmation of this hypothesis relies on assumptions that must be confirmed alongside it such as the absence of any chemical that will interfere with their separation and that the eyes of the observer are functioning well enough to observe the separation. Because mathematical theories are assumed by scientific theories, confirmational holism implies the empirical confirmations of scientific theories also support these mathematical theories. Naturalism and confirmational holism accepted together imply we should believe in science, and that we should believe in the entirety of science and nothing other than science.

The second premise of the indispensability argument states mathematical objects are indispensable to our best scientific theories. In this context, indispensability is not the same as ineliminability because any entity can be eliminated from a theoretical system given appropriate adjustments to the other parts of the system. Therefore, dispensability requires an entity is eliminable without sacrificing the attractiveness of the theory. For example, to be dispensable, an entity must be eliminable without causing the theory to become less simple, less explanatorily successful, or less theoretically virtuous in any way. If an entity is dispensable to a theory, an equivalent theory can be formulated without it. This is the case, for example, if each sentence in one theory is a paraphrase of a sentence in another or if the two theories predict the same empirical observations.

Another key part of the argument is the concept of ontological commitment. To say we should have an ontological commitment to an entity means we should believe that entity exists. Quine believed we should have ontological commitment to all the entities to which our best scientific theories are themselves committed. According to Quine's "criterion of ontological commitment", the commitments of a theory can be found by translating or "regimenting" the theory from ordinary language into first-order logic. This criterion says the ontological commitments of the theory are all of the objects over which the regimented theory quantifies; the existential quantifier for Quine was the natural equivalent of the ordinary language term "there is", which he believed obviously carries ontological commitment. Quine thought it is important to translate our best scientific theories into first-order logic because ordinary language is ambiguous whereas logic can make the commitments of a theory more precise. Translating theories to first-order logic also has advantages over translating it to higher-order logics such as second-order logic. Whilst second-order logic has the same expressive power as first-order logic, it lacks some of the technical strengths of first-order logic such as completeness and compactness. Second-order logic also allows quantification over properties like "redness" but whether we have ontological commitment to properties is controversial. According to Quine, such quantification is simply ungrammatical.

Whilst all of these theses have been used to build the argument, it has been argued indispensability arguments can be constructed without some of them. For example, a number of philosophers—including Resnik, Alan Baker, Patrick Dieveney, David Liggins, Jacob Busch, and Andrea Sereni—argue confirmational holism can be eliminated from the argument. Busch, Sereni, and Marco Panza also said naturalism is unnecessary for the argument to work because the weaker thesis of scientific realism is all that is required to ensure the truth of scientific theories. According to Busch and Sereni, a minimal form of the argument can be constructed solely from the theses of indispensability and Quine's criterion of ontological commitment. More-modern presentations of the argument do not necessarily accept Quine's criterion of ontological commitment and may allow for ontological commitments to be directly determined from ordinary language. Whilst Quine's original argument is an argument for platonism, indispensability arguments can also be constructed to argue for the weaker claim of sentence realism—the claim mathematical theory is objectively true. This is a weaker claim because it does not necessarily imply there are abstract mathematical objects.

The indispensability argument differs from other arguments for platonism because it only argues for belief in the parts of mathematics that are indispensable to science. It does not necessarily justify belief in the most-abstract parts of set theory, which Quine called "mathematical recreation … without ontological rights". Some philosophers infer from the argument mathematical knowledge is a posteriori because it implies mathematical truths can only be established via the empirical confirmation of scientific theories to which they are indispensable. This also indicates mathematical truths are contingent since empirically known truths are generally contingent. Such a position is controversial because it contradicts the traditional view of mathematics as a priori knowledge of necessary truths. The argument also has the consequence of subordinating mathematical practice to the natural sciences in the sense its legitimacy depends on them.

Counterarguments 
Many counterarguments to the Quine–Putnam indispensability argument have been formulated. Some deny mathematical objects are indispensable for scientific theories whereas others reject confirmational holism, arguing we cannot deduce the existence of mathematical entities from science even if they are indispensable. A similar argument is talking about mathematical objects or quantifying over them is a convenient linguistic practice but does not imply they exist. A further counterargument rejects the consequence of the Quine–Putnam indispensability argument mathematical practice is subordinated to the empirical sciences.

Dispensability 

According to the Stanford Encyclopedia of Philosophy, the most-influential argument against the indispensability argument comes from Field. It rejects the claim mathematical objects are indispensable to science; Field tries to show this by reformulating or "nominalising" scientific theories so they do not refer to mathematical objects. In support of this project, Field has offered a reformulation of Newtonian physics in terms of the relationships between space-time points. Instead of referring to numerical distances, Field's reformulation uses relationships such as "between" and "congruent" to recover the theory without implying the existence of numbers. John Burgess and Mark Balaguer have taken steps to extend this nominalising project to areas of modern physics including quantum mechanics. Philosophers such as David Malament and Otávio Bueno dispute whether such reformulations are successful or even possible, particularly in the case of quantum mechanics.

Field's alternative to platonism is mathematical fictionalism, according to which, mathematical theories make claims about abstract mathematical objects but that these do not exist because abstract objects do not exist, so mathematical theory is false. As part of his argument against the indispensability argument, Field has tried to explain how and why mathematics is used in science despite being false and ultimately dispensable. His argument is based on the idea mathematics is conservative. A mathematical theory is conservative if, when combined with a scientific theory, it does not produce any additional non-mathematical consequences the scientific theory would not have already had. This implies mathematics can be used by scientific theories without making the predictions of science false, even if the mathematics itself is false, and therefore explains how it is possible for such mathematics to be useful for science. Field thinks mathematics is useful for science because mathematical language provides a useful shorthand for talking about complex physical systems.

Another nominalising approach to undermining the indispensability argument is to reformulate mathematical theories themselves so they do not imply the existence of mathematical objects. Charles Chihara, Geoffrey Hellman, and Putnam have offered modal reformulations of mathematics that replace all references to mathematical objects with claims about possibilities.

Confirmational holism 
According to Penelope Maddy, the theses of naturalism and confirmational holism that make up the first premise are in tension with one another. Maddy said naturalism tells us we should respect the methods used by scientists as the best method for uncovering the truth, but scientists do not seem to act as though we should believe in all of the entities that are indispensable to science. To illustrate this point, Maddy uses the example of atomic theory; she said despite the atom being indispensable to scientists' best theories by 1860, their reality was not universally accepted until 1913 when they were put to a direct experimental test. Maddy also appeals to the fact scientists use mathematical idealizations such as assuming bodies of water to be infinitely deep without regard for the trueness of such applications of mathematics. According to Maddy, this indicates scientists do not view the indispensable use of mathematics for science as justification for the belief in mathematics or mathematical entities. Overall, Maddy said we should side with naturalism and reject confirmational holism, meaning we do not need to believe in all of the entities that are indispensable to science.

Elliott Sober said mathematical theories are not tested in the same way as scientific theories. Whilst scientific theories compete with alternatives to find which theory has the most empirical support, there are no alternatives for mathematical theory to compete with because all scientific theories share the same mathematical core. As a result, according to Sober, mathematical theories do not share the empirical support of our best scientific theories so we should reject confirmational holism.

Other arguments 
In his counterargument, Melia appeals to a practice he calls weaseling, which occurs when a person makes a statement and then later withdraws something implied by that statement. An example of weaseling is the statement: "Everyone who came to the seminar had a handout. Except the person who came in late." Whilst this statement can be interpreted as being self-contradictory, it is more charitable to interpret it as coherently making the claim "Except for the person who came in late, everyone who came to the seminar had a handout". Melia said a similar situation occurs in scientists' use of statements that imply the existence of mathematical objects. According to Melia, whilst scientists use statements that imply the existence of mathematics in their theories, "almost all scientists ... deny that there are such things as mathematical objects". As in the seminar-handout example, Melia said it is most charitable to interpret the scientists not as contradicting themselves but rather as weaseling away their commitment to mathematical objects. According to Melia, weaseling is acceptable in this case because the role of mathematics in science is not genuinely explanatory and is solely used to "make more things sayable about concrete objects". As a result, he said it is acceptable to not believe in the mathematical objects that scientists weasel away.

Jody Azzouni has objected to Quine's criterion of ontological commitment, saying the existential quantifier in first-order logic need not be interpreted as always carrying ontological commitment. According to Azzouni, the ordinary language equivalent of existential quantification "there is" is often used in sentences without implying ontological commitment. In particular, Azzouni points to the use of "there is" when referring to fictional objects in sentences such as "there are fictional detectives who are admired by some real detectives". According to Azzouni, for us to have ontological commitment to an entity, we must have the right level of epistemic access to it. This means, for example, that it must overcome some epistemic burdens for us to be able to postulate it. But according to Azzouni, mathematical entities are "mere posits" that can be postulated by anyone at any time by "simply writing down a set of axioms" so we do not need to treat them as real.

The subordination of mathematical practice to the natural sciences by this argument has also faced criticism. Charles Parsons has said mathematical truths seem immediately obvious in a way that suggests they do not depend on the results of our best theories. Similarly, Maddy has said mathematicians do not seem to believe their practice is restricted in any way by the activity of the natural sciences. For example, mathematicians' arguments over the axioms of Zermelo–Fraenkel set theory do not appeal to their applications to the natural sciences.

Historical development

Precursors and influences on Quine 

The argument is historically associated with Willard Quine and Hilary Putnam but it can be traced to earlier thinkers such as Gottlob Frege and Kurt Gödel. In his arguments against mathematical formalism—a view that argues mathematics is akin to a game like chess with rules about how mathematical symbols such as "2" can be manipulated—Frege said in 1903 "it is applicability alone which elevates arithmetic from a game to the rank of a science". Gödel, concerned about the axioms of set theory, said in a 1947 paper if a new axiom were to have enough verifiable consequences, it "would have to be accepted at least in the same sense as any well‐established physical theory". Frege's and Gödel's indispensability arguments differ from later versions of the argument because they lack features such as naturalism and subordination of practice, which were introduced by Quine, leading some philosophers including Pieranna Garavaso to say they are not genuine examples of the indispensability argument.

Whilst developing his philosophical view of confirmational holism, Quine was influenced by Pierre Duhem. At the beginning of the twentieth century, Duhem defended the law of inertia from critics who said  it is devoid of empirical content and unfalsifiable. These critics based this claim on the fact the law does not make any observable predictions without positing some observational frame of reference and that falsifying instances can always be avoided by changing the choice of reference frame. Duhem responded by saying the law produces predictions when paired with auxiliary hypotheses fixing the frame of reference and is therefore no different from any other physical theory. Duhem said although individual hypotheses may make no observable predictions alone, they can be confirmed as parts of systems of hypotheses. Quine extended this idea to mathematical hypotheses. Analogous to the law of inertia, mathematical hypotheses hold no empirical content on their own but according to Quine, they can share in the empirical confirmations of the systems of hypotheses in which they are contained. This thesis later came to be known as the Duhem–Quine thesis.

Quine described his naturalism as the "abandonment of the goal of a first philosophy. It sees natural science as an inquiry into reality, fallible and corrigible but not answerable to any supra-scientific tribunal, and not in need of any justification beyond observation and the hypothetico-deductive method." The term "first philosophy" is used in reference to Descartes' Meditations on First Philosophy, in which Descartes used his method of doubt in an attempt to secure the foundations of science. Quine said Descartes' attempts to provide the foundations for science had failed and said the project of finding a foundational justification for science should be rejected because he believed philosophy could never provide a method of justification more convincing than the scientific method. Quine was also influenced by the logical positivists such as his teacher Rudolf Carnap; his naturalism was formulated in response to many of their ideas. For the logical positivists, all justified beliefs were reducible to sense data, including our knowledge of ordinary objects such as trees. Quine criticized sense data as self-defeating, saying we must believe in ordinary objects to organize our experiences of the world. He also said because science is our best theory of how sense-experience gives us beliefs about ordinary objects, we should believe in it as well. Whilst the logical positivists said individual claims must be supported by sense data, Quine's confirmational holism means scientific theory is inherently tied up with mathematical theory and so evidence for scientific theories can justify belief in mathematical objects despite them not being directly perceived.

Quine and Putnam 
Whilst eventually becoming a self-described "reluctant platonist" due to his formulation of the indispensability argument, Quine was sympathetic to nominalism from the early stages of his career. In a 1946 lecture, he said; "I will put my cards on the table now and avow my prejudices: I should like to be able to accept nominalism"; in 1947 he released a paper with Nelson Goodman titled "Steps toward a Constructive Nominalism" as part of a joint project to "set up a nominalistic language in which all of natural science can be expressed". In a letter to Joseph Henry Woodger the following year, however, Quine said he was becoming more convinced "the assumption of abstract entities and the assumptions of the external world are assumptions of the same sort". He subsequently released the 1948 paper "On What There Is", in which he said "[t]he analogy between the myth of mathematics and the myth of physics is ... strikingly close", marking a shift towards his eventual acceptance of a "reluctant platonism".

Throughout the 1950s, Quine regularly mentioned platonism, nominalism, and constructivism as plausible views, and he had not yet reached a definitive conclusion about which is correct. It is unclear exactly when Quine accepted platonism; in 1953, he distanced himself from the claims of nominalism in his 1947 paper with Goodman but by 1956, Goodman was still describing Quine's "defection" from nominalism as "still somewhat tentative". According to Lieven Decock, Quine had accepted the need for abstract mathematical entities by the publication of his 1960 book Word and Object, in which he wrote "a thoroughgoing nominalist doctrine is too much to live up to". However, whilst he released suggestions of the indispensability argument in a number of papers, he never gave it a detailed formulation.

Putnam gave the argument its first explicit presentation in his 1971 book Philosophy of Logic in which he attributed it to Quine. He stated the argument as "quantification over mathematical entities is indispensable for science, both formal and physical; therefore we should accept such quantification; but this commits us to accepting the existence of the mathematical entities in question." He also wrote Quine had "for years stressed both the indispensability of quantification over mathematical entities and the intellectual dishonesty of denying the existence of what one daily presupposes." Putnam's endorsement of Quine's version of the argument is disputed. The Internet Encyclopedia of Philosophy states; "In his early work, Hilary Putnam accepted Quine's version of the indispensability argument" and Liggins said the argument has been attributed to Putnam by many philosophers of mathematics. Liggins and Bueno, however, said Putnam never endorsed the argument and only presented it as an argument from Quine. Putnam has said he differed with Quine in his attitude to the argument from at least 1975. Features of the argument that Putnam came to disagree with include its reliance on a single, regimented, best theory.

In 1975, Putnam formulated his own indispensability argument based on the no miracles argument in the philosophy of science, which argues the success of science can only be explained by scientific realism without being rendered miraculous. He wrote that year: "I believe that the positive argument for realism [in science] has an analogue in the case of mathematical realism. Here too, I believe, realism is the only philosophy that doesn't make the success of the science a miracle". According to the Internet Encyclopedia of Philosophy, this version of the argument can be used to argue for platonism and sentence realism, although Putnam used it to argue for sentence realism. Putnam's view is a reformulation of mathematics in terms of modal logic that maintains mathematical objectivity without being committed to mathematical objects. According to the Internet Encyclopedia of Philosophy, Putnam's version of the argument is "Putnam's success argument" and presents it in the form:

 Mathematics succeeds as the language of science.
 There must be a reason for the success of mathematics as the language of science.
 No positions other than realism in mathematics provide a reason.
 Therefore, realism in mathematics must be correct.

The first and second premises of the argument have been seen as uncontroversial so discussion of this argument has been focused on the third premise. Other positions that have attempted to provide a reason for the success of mathematics includes Field's reformulations of science, which explain the usefulness of mathematics as a conservative shorthand. Putnam has criticized Field's reformulations as only applying to classical physics and for being unlikely to be able to be extended to future fundamental physics.

Continued development of the argument 

Chihara, in his 1973 nominalist book Ontology and the Vicious Circle Principle, reformulated mathematics in response to Quine's arguments. Field's Science without Numbers followed in 1980 and dominated discussion about the indispensability argument throughout the 1980s and 1990s. According to Russell Marcus, Science without Numbers marked the beginning of the scholarship developing the debate over the argument. Maddy and Sober published papers in 1992 and 1993 that inspired versions of the argument that do not depend on confirmational holism, including a pragmatic version of the argument offered by Resnik in 1995 that "claims that the justification for doing science ... also justifies our accepting as true such mathematics as science uses". Resnik also provided a Quinean formulation of the indispensability argument explicitly depending on naturalism and holism: if mathematics is an indispensable component of science, then, by holism, whatever evidence we have for science is also evidence for the mathematical objects and mathematical principles it presupposes. So, by naturalism, mathematics is true, and the existence of mathematical objects is as well grounded as that of the other entities posited by science."

Colyvan's formulation in his 1998 paper "In Defence of Indispensability" and his 2001 book The Indispensability of Mathematics is often seen as the standard or "canonical" formulation of the argument within more-recent philosophical work. Colyvan's version of the argument has been influential in debates in contemporary philosophy of mathematics. It differs in key ways from the arguments presented by Quine and Putnam. Quine's version of the argument relies on translating scientific theories from ordinary language into first-order logic to determine its ontological commitments whereas the modern version allows  ontological commitments to be directly determined from ordinary language. Putnam's arguments were for the objectivity of mathematics but not necessarily for mathematical objects. Colyvan has said "the attribution to Quine and Putnam [is] an acknowledgement of intellectual debts rather than an indication that the argument, as presented, would be endorsed in every detail by either Quine or Putnam". Putnam has distanced himself from this version of the argument, saying; "From my point of view, Colyvan's description of my argument(s) is far from right" and has contrasted his indispensability argument with "the fictitious 'Quine–Putnam indispensability argument'".

Inspired by Maddy's and Sober's arguments against confirmational holism, as well as Melia's argument we can suspend belief in mathematics if it does not play a genuinely explanatory role in science, Colyvan and Baker have defended an explanatory version of the argument. In 1989, Field first raised the connection between the indispensability argument and mathematical explanations and Baker later cited him as originating an explanatory version of the argument, although he did not fully formulate such an argument. Colyvan and Baker released early papers advancing this form of the argument in the late 1990s and early 2000s, with Baker giving an explicit formulation in his 2005 paper "Are There Genuine Mathematical Explanations of Physical Phenomena?" This version of the argument attempts to remove the reliance on confirmational holism by replacing it with an inference to the best explanation. It states we are justified in believing in mathematical objects because they appear in our best scientific explanations, not because they inherit the empirical support of our best theories. It is presented by the Internet Encyclopedia of Philosophy in the following form:

 There are genuinely mathematical explanations of empirical phenomena.
 We ought to be committed to the theoretical posits in such explanations.
 Therefore, we ought to be committed to the entities postulated by the mathematics in question.

An example of mathematics' explanatory indispensability presented by Baker is the periodic cicada, a type of insect that has life cycles of 13 or 17 years. It is hypothesised this is an evolutionary advantage because 13 and 17 are prime numbers. Because prime numbers have no non-trivial factors, this means it is less likely predators can synchronize with the cicadas' life cycles. Baker said this is an explanation in which mathematics, specifically number theory, plays a key role in explaining an empirical phenomenon. Other important examples are explanations of the hexagonal structure of bee honeycomb, the existence of antipodes on the Earth's surface that have identical temperature and pressure, the connection between Minkowski space and Lorentz contraction, and the impossibility of crossing all seven bridges of Königsberg only once in a walk across the city. The main response to this form of the argument, which philosophers such as Melia, Chris Daly, Simon Langford, and Juha Saatsi adopted, is to deny there are genuinely mathematical explanations of empirical phenomena, instead framing the role of mathematics as representational or indexical.

Influence 

According to James Franklin, the indispensability argument is widely considered to be the best argument for platonism in the philosophy of mathematics. Stanford Encyclopedia of Philosophy identifies it as one of the major arguments in the debate between mathematical realism and mathematical anti-realism alongside Benacerraf's epistemological problem for platonism, Benacerraf's identification problem, and Benacerraf's argument for platonism that there should be uniformity between mathematical and non-mathematical semantics. According to Stanford Encyclopedia of Philosophy, some within the field see it as the only good argument for platonism.

Quine's and Putnam's arguments have also been influential outside philosophy of mathematics, inspiring indispensability arguments in other areas of philosophy. For example, David Lewis, who was a student of Quine, used an indispensability argument to argue for modal realism in his 1986 book "On the Plurality of Worlds". According to his argument, quantification over possible worlds is indispensable to our best philosophical theories, so we should believe in their concrete existence. Other indispensability arguments in metaphysics are defended by philosophers such as David Malet Armstrong, Graeme Forbes, and Alvin Plantinga, who have argued for the existence of states of affairs due to the indispensable theoretical role they play in our best philosophical theories of truthmakers, modality, and possible worlds. In the field of ethics, David Enoch has expanded the criterion of ontological commitment used in the Quine–Putnam indispensability argument to argue for moral realism. According to Enoch's "deliberative indispensability argument", indispensability to deliberation is just as ontologically committing as indispensability to science, and moral facts are indispensable to deliberation. Therefore, according to Enoch, we should believe in moral facts.

Notes

References

Citations

Sources

Primary sources 
This section provides a list of the primary sources that are referred to or quoted in the article but not used to source content.

 
 
 
 
 
 
 
 
 
 
 
 
 
 
 
 
 
 
 
 
 
 
 
 
 
 
 
 
 
 
 
 
 
 
 
 
 
 

Philosophy of mathematics
Philosophical arguments
Willard Van Orman Quine